Anete Kociņa (born 5 February 1996 in Limbaži) is a Latvian javelin thrower.

International competitions

References

External links 

1996 births
Living people
Latvian female javelin throwers
World Athletics Championships athletes for Latvia
Competitors at the 2017 Summer Universiade
Athletes (track and field) at the 2020 Summer Olympics
Olympic athletes of Latvia